Panopea is a genus of large marine bivalve molluscs or clams in the family Hiatellidae. There are 10 described species in Panopea. Many of them are known under the common name "geoduck".

Extant species
 Panopea abbreviata (Valenciennes, 1839) – southern geoduck
 Panopea australis (G.B. Sowerby I, 1833)
 Panopea bitruncata (Conrad, 1872)
 Panopea generosa Gould, 1850 – Pacific geoduck
 Panopea globosa Dall, 1898 – Cortes geoduck
 Panopea glycimeris (Born, 1778)
 Panopea japonica Adams, 1850 – Japanese geoduck
 Panopea smithae Powell, 1950
 Panopea zelandica Quoy & Gaimard, 1835 – deepwater clam

Extinct species

Extinct species within this genus include:
 † Panopea abrupta (Conrad, 1849) (extinct Miocene fossil)
 † Panopea depressa  Martin 1859
 † Panopea dockensis  Olsson and Petit 1964
 † Panopea elongata  Conrad 1835
 † Panopea gastaldii  Michelotti 1861
 † Panopea gurgitis  Brongniart, 1822
 † Panopea intermedia  Sowerby 1814
 † Panopea mackrothi Geinitz 1857
 † Panopea montignyana  Martin 1859
 † Panopea orientalis  Forbes 1846
 † Panopea remondii  Gabb 1864
 † Panopea toulai  Lundgren 1895
 † Panopea vaudini  Deshayes 1857

The fossil record of the genus dates back to the Cretaceous (and maybe the Triassic) (age range: 242.0 to 0.012 million years ago). These fossils have been found all over the world.

References

External links

Hiatellidae
Bivalve genera